Frocester railway station served the village of Frocester in Gloucestershire, England. The station was on the Bristol and Gloucester Railway, originally a broad gauge line overseen by Isambard Kingdom Brunel, but later taken over by the Midland Railway and converted to standard gauge.

Frocester was a small station designed by Brunel, with short platforms, a small signalbox and a large stone goods shed. It opened with the railway in 1844 and remained virtually unchanged throughout its life, being the least used station on the Bristol to Gloucester line.

Passenger and goods services were withdrawn from Frocester on 11 December 1961, four years before other local stations on the line lost their services. The station buildings were demolished and the signalbox also closed. The station-master's house remains in residential use.

Services

References

Stroud District
Former Midland Railway stations
Disused railway stations in Gloucestershire
Railway stations in Great Britain opened in 1844
Railway stations in Great Britain closed in 1961